Isael Villa Villa (born 5 April 1956) is a Mexican politician affiliated with the Institutional Revolutionary Party. He served as Deputy of the LX Legislature of the Mexican Congress representing the State of Mexico, and previously served in the LIII Legislature of the Congress of the State of Mexico.

References

1956 births
Living people
Politicians from the State of Mexico
Institutional Revolutionary Party politicians
20th-century Mexican politicians
21st-century Mexican politicians
Members of the Congress of the State of Mexico
Deputies of the LX Legislature of Mexico
Members of the Chamber of Deputies (Mexico) for the State of Mexico